= Eiokome =

Town of ancient Phrygia

Coordinates: 39°23′10″N 30°18′38″E

Eiokome was a town of ancient Phrygia, inhabited during Roman times.

Its site is tentatively located near Söğüt Yaylası in Asiatic Turkey.
